Red bream may refer to:
Rose fish
Pacific ocean perch
Australasian snapper